The Tapo-Caparo National Park Also National Park Tapo Caparo Is a protected area with the national park status in Venezuela, which covers an area estimated at 2,050 square kilometers and is administratively located between the states of Barinas, Mérida and Táchira, to the west of Venezuelan territory. National park was decreed The 14 of January 1992 in the government of the then president Carlos Andrés Pérez.

It has a diversity of forests, ferns and mosses, lichens, fungi, fauna that includes jaguars, toucans, boas and numerous gorges and rivers, was created with the purpose of protecting the nature near a dam called Uribante-Caparo hydroelectric complex.

See also
List of national parks of Venezuela
Canaima National Park

References

National parks of Venezuela
Protected areas established in 1992
1992 establishments in Venezuela
Geography of Mérida (state)
Geography of Táchira
Geography of Barinas (state)
Tourist attractions in Mérida (state)
Tourist attractions in Táchira
Tourist attractions in Barinas (state)